Siliguri Mahakuma Parishad election was held on June 26, 2022 to elect all members of Siliguri Mahakuma parishad, its Panchayet Samitis and its Panchayets.

Schedule 
The election schedule was declared by West Bengal State Election Commission on 27 May 2022.

Parties and alliances 
Source:

* Marked parties may have allotted other independents symbols as they are recognized in states other than West Bengal. Their symbols listed in the table are allotted by ECI as state parties of other states.

Candidates 
Source:

Voter Turnout 
Source:

Result

Party-wise Result

MP detail constituency-wise Result

PS-wise Result

GP-wise Result

References 

2022 elections in India
Local elections in West Bengal
Siliguri